Kinsley greyhound stadium is a Greyhound Board of Great Britain regulated greyhound racing stadium situated in Kinsley, West Yorkshire, England. It was voted "Best National Greyhound Racing Club greyhound stadium in the north" by the British Greyhound Racing Board for 2008.

Racing 
Racing takes place every Saturday evening in addition to their three ARC meetings one of which includes Sunday afternoons.

The circumference of the track at Kinsley is 385 metres.

Competitions 
Gymcrack

History 
The Kinsley greyhound track is situated between Leeds and Doncaster and was built and opened in 1939. The track was independent (also known as a flapping track) and served the local mining village. After the war the track could accommodate a maximum of 3,500 spectators.

In 1985 John Curran and Keith Murrell took over the running of the track and invested into the stadium by improving the facilities. Distances were changed to 100, 260, 330, 460 & 630 metres, an 'Inside Sumner' hare was put in and a competition was introduced called the Kinsley Greyhound Derby. The race offered £20,000 eclipsing many of the top National Greyhound Racing Club events at the time. A computer totalisator was added and twelve bookmakers stood on course. There were 48 kennels on site and the Jubilee restaurant offered room for 160 covers. The track was beginning to show all the hallmarks of a regulated circuit and even had a thriving social club open all week.

Despite the significant stature of the track it was not until 2000 that the decision was finally taken to apply for an NGRC licence which was granted. The new distances were 275, 450, 485 and 656 metres. Keith Murrell acted as Racing Manager until Craig Hunt was brought in to take up the role. The first meeting was on 15 January 2000 and racing was on Tuesday, Friday and Saturday evenings. Distances have since changed on two more occasions and a Swaffham hare has been introduced.

In 2010 the track was rewarded by being allocated the 2010 Television Trophy, an event won by Midway Skipper and in 2011 the Gymcrack was introduced after it switched from Hall Green Stadium. The first winner was Nick Colton's Taranis Rex, a black and white dog that also broke the track record in the process. In 2018 Brinkleys Poet won the event and set a new track record time by beating the previous best time of 27.02 by Droopys Trapeze.

In 2018 the stadium signed a deal with ARC to race a Tuesday and Friday matinée meeting and a Sunday afternoon meeting every week.

Track records

Current

Former

References

External links
 Official Website

Greyhound racing venues in the United Kingdom
Sports venues in West Yorkshire
Hemsworth